Newcastle United Football Club is an English professional football club based in Newcastle upon Tyne, Tyne and Wear. The club competes in the Premier League, the highest level of the English football league system. The club was founded in 1892 by the merger of Newcastle East End and Newcastle West End. The team play their home matches at St James' Park in the centre of Newcastle. Following the Taylor Report's requirement that all Premier League clubs have all-seater stadiums, the ground was modified in the mid-1990s and currently has a capacity of 52,305.

The club has been a member of the Premier League for all but three years of the competition's history, spending 90 seasons in the top flight as of May 2022, and has never dropped below English football's second tier since joining the Football League in 1893. Newcastle have won four League titles, six FA Cups and a FA Charity Shield, as well as the 1968–69 Inter-Cities Fairs Cup, the ninth-highest total of trophies won by an English club. The club's most successful period was between 1904 and 1910, when they won an FA Cup and three of their League titles. Their last major trophy was in 1955 More recently the club have been League or FA Cup runners-up on four occasions in the 1990s. Newcastle was relegated in 2009, and again in 2016. The club won promotion at the first time of asking each time, returning to the Premier League, as Championship winners, in 2010 and 2017.

Newcastle has a long-standing rivalry with nearby Sunderland, with which it contests the Tyne–Wear derby since 1898. The team's traditional kit colours are black-and-white striped shirts, black shorts and black socks. Their crest has elements of the city coat of arms, which features two grey hippocamps. Before each home game, the team enters the field to "Local Hero", and "Blaydon Races" is also sung during games. The 2005 film Goal! featured Newcastle United, and many credit the film with raising the club's popularity among players and fans.

History

1881–1903: Formation and early history

The first record of football being played on Tyneside dates from 3 March 1877 at Elswick Rugby Club. Later that year, Newcastle's first football club, Tyne Association, was formed. The origins of Newcastle United Football Club itself can be traced back to the formation of a football club by the Stanley Cricket Club of Byker in November 1881. This team was renamed Newcastle East End F.C. in October 1882, to avoid confusion with the cricket club in Stanley, County Durham. Rosewood F.C. of Byker merged with Newcastle East End a short time later. In 1886, Newcastle East End moved from Byker to Heaton. In August 1882, Newcastle West End F.C. formed from West End Cricket Club, and in May 1886 moved into St James' Park. The two clubs became rivals in the Northern League. In 1889, Newcastle East End became a professional team, before becoming a limited company the following March. Newcastle West End, on the other hand, was in serious financial trouble and approached East End with a view to a takeover. Newcastle West End was eventually dissolved, and a number of its players and backroom staff joined Newcastle East End, effectively merging the two clubs, with Newcastle East End taking over the lease on St James' Park in May 1892.

With only one senior club in the city for fans to support, development of the club was much more rapid. Despite being refused entry to the Football League's First Division at the start of the 1892–93 season, they were invited to play in their new Second Division. However, with no big names playing in the Second Division, they turned down the offer and remained in the Northern League, stating "gates would not meet the heavy expenses incurred for travelling". In a bid to start drawing larger crowds, Newcastle East End decided to adopt a new name in recognition of the merger. Suggested names included 1892 Newcastle, Newcastle Rangers, Newcastle City and City of Newcastle, but Newcastle United was decided upon on 9 December 1892, to signify the unification of the two teams. The name change was accepted by the Football Association on 22 December, but the club was not legally constituted as Newcastle United Football Club Co. Ltd. until 6 September 1895. At the start of the 1893–94 season, Newcastle United were once again refused entry to the First Division and so joined the Second Division, along with Liverpool and Woolwich Arsenal. They played their first competitive match in the division that September against Woolwich Arsenal, with a score of 2–2.

Turnstile numbers were still low, and the incensed club published a statement stating, "The Newcastle public do not deserve to be catered for as far as professional football is concerned". However, eventually figures picked up by 1895–96, when 14,000 fans watched the team play Bury. That season Frank Watt became secretary of the club, and he was instrumental in promotion to the First Division for the 1898–99 season. However, they lost their first game 4–2 at home to Wolverhampton Wanderers and finished their first season in 13th place.

1903–1937: First glory years and war years

In 1903–04, the club built up a promising squad of players, and went on to dominate English football for almost a decade, the team known for their "artistic play, combining team-work and quick, short passing". Long after his retirement, Peter McWilliam, the team's defender at the time, said, "The Newcastle team of the 1900s would give any modern side a two goal start and beat them, and furthermore, beat them at a trot." Newcastle United went on to win the League on three occasions during the 1900s; 1904–05, 1906–07 and 1908–09. In 1904–05, they nearly did the double, losing to Aston Villa in the 1905 FA Cup Final. They were beaten again the following year by Everton in the 1906 FA Cup Final. They reached the final again in 1908 where they lost to Wolverhampton Wanderers. They finally won the FA Cup in 1910 when they beat Barnsley in the final. They lost again the following year in the final against Bradford City.

The team returned to the FA Cup final in 1924, in the second final held at the then new Wembley Stadium. They beat Aston Villa, winning the club's second FA Cup. Three years later, they won the First Division championship a fourth time in 1926–27, with Hughie Gallacher, one of the most prolific goal scorers in the club's history, captaining the team. Other key players in this period were Neil Harris, Stan Seymour and Frank Hudspeth. In 1930, Newcastle United came close to relegation, and at the end of the season Gallacher left the club for Chelsea, and at the same time Andy Cunningham became the club's first team manager. In 1931–32, the club won the FA Cup a third time. However, a couple of years later, at the end of the 1933–34 season, the team were relegated to the Second Division after 35 seasons in the top. Cunningham left as manager and Tom Mather took over.

1937–1969: Post-war success

The club found it difficult to adjust to the Second Division and were nearly further relegated in the 1937–38 season, when they were spared on goal average. However, when World War II broke out in 1939, Newcastle had a chance to regroup, and in the War period, they brought in Jackie Milburn, Tommy Walker and Bobby Cowell. They were finally promoted back to the First Division at the end of the 1947–48 season. During the 1950s, Newcastle won the FA Cup three times in five years, beating Blackpool in 1951, Arsenal in 1952 and Manchester City in 1955. However, after this last FA Cup victory the club fell back into decline and were relegated to the Second Division once again at the end of the 1960–61 season under the management of Charlie Mitten. Mitten left after one season in the Second Division and was replaced by former player Joe Harvey. Newcastle returned to the First Division at the end of the 1964–65 season after winning the Second Division title. Under Harvey, the club qualified for European competition for the first time after a good run in the 1967–68 season and the following year won the 1969 Inter-Cities Fairs Cup Final, triumphing 6–2 over two legs against Hungary's Újpest in the final.

1969–1992: Bouncing between divisions
Harvey bought striker Malcolm Macdonald in the summer of 1971, for a club record transfer fee of £180,000 (equivalent to £2,265,000 in 2021). He was an impressive goal scorer, who led United's attack to Wembley in their 1974 FA Cup Final defeat at the hands of Liverpool. The club also had back to back triumphs in the Texaco Cup in 1974 and 1975. Harvey left the club in 1975, with Gordon Lee brought in to replace him. Lee took the team to the 1976 Football League Cup Final against Manchester City, but failed to bring the trophy back to Tyneside. However, he sold Macdonald to Arsenal at the end of the season, a decision of which Macdonald later said "I loved Newcastle, until Gordon Lee took over". Lee left for Everton in 1977, and was replaced by Richard Dinnis.

United dropped once again to the Second Division at the end of the 1977–78 season. Dinnis was replaced by Bill McGarry, and then he was replaced by Arthur Cox. Cox steered Newcastle back to the First Division at the end of the 1983–84 season, with players such as Peter Beardsley, Chris Waddle and ex-England captain Kevin Keegan the fulcrum of the team. However, with a lack of funds, Cox left for Derby County and Keegan retired. With managers such as Jack Charlton and then Willie McFaul, Newcastle remained in the top-flight, until key players such as Waddle, Beardsley and Paul Gascoigne were sold, and the team was relegated once more in the 1988–89 season. McFaul left the managerial post, and was replaced by Jim Smith. Smith left at the start of the 1991–92 season and the board appointed Osvaldo Ardiles his replacement.

John Hall became the club's chairman in 1992, and replaced Ardiles with Keegan, who managed to save the team from relegation to the Third Division. Keegan was given more money for players, buying Rob Lee, Paul Bracewell and Barry Venison. The club won the First Division championship at the end of the 1992–93 season, earning promotion to the then new Premier League.

1993–2007: Into the Premier League

At the end of their first year, 1993–94 season, back in the top flight they finished in third, their highest league finish since 1927. The attacking philosophy of Keegan led to the team being labelled "The Entertainers" by Sky Sports.

Keegan took Newcastle to two consecutive runners-up finishes in the league in 1995–96 and 1996–97, coming very close to winning the title in the former season which included a 4–3 game against Liverpool at Anfield – often considered the greatest game in Premier League history – which ended with a defining image of the Premier League with Keegan slumped over the advertising hoarding. The success of the team was in part due to the attacking talent of players like David Ginola, Les Ferdinand and Alan Shearer, who was signed on 30 July 1996 for a then world record fee of £15 million.

Keegan left Newcastle in January 1997 and was replaced by Kenny Dalglish, however the club endured a largely unsuccessful season with a 13th-place finish in the 1997–98 FA Premier League, failure to progress beyond the group stages of the 1997–98 UEFA Champions League despite beating Barcelona and group winners Dynamo Kyiv at home as well as coming from 2–0 down to draw 2–2 with Valeriy Lobanovskyi's team in Ukraine and defeat in the 1998 FA Cup Final. Dalglish was replaced as manager early in the following season by Ruud Gullit. The club once again finished 13th in the league and lost the 1999 FA Cup Final. Gullit fell into disagreements with the squad and chairman Freddy Shepherd, and quit the club five games into the 1999–2000 season with the team bottom of the table to be replaced by Bobby Robson. In 1999 Newcastle was 5th-highest revenue producing club in the world; second in England behind Manchester United.

A title challenge emerged during the 2001–02 season, and Newcastle's fourth-place finish saw them qualify for the UEFA Champions League. The following season, Robson guided the team to another title challenge and finished third in the League, and the second group stage of the Champions League, after being the first team to have progressed past the first group stage after losing their first three games. Newcastle finished fifth in the league at the end of the 2003–04 season, and exited the Champions League in the qualifying rounds, but despite this Robson was sacked in August 2004 following a series of disagreements with the club.

Graeme Souness was brought in to manage by the start of the 2004–05 season. In his time at the helm, he broke the club's transfer record by signing Michael Owen for £16.8 million. Souness also took Newcastle to the quarter-finals of the 2004–05 UEFA Cup with Alan Shearer winning the tournament's golden boot as well. However, he was sacked in February 2006 after a bad start to the club's 2005–06 season. Glenn Roeder took over, initially on a temporary basis, before being appointed full-time manager at the end of the season. Shearer retired at the end of the 2005–06 season as the club's all-time record goal scorer, with 206 goals.

Despite finishing the 2005–06 season in seventh, Roeder's fortunes changed in the 2006–07 season, with a terrible injury run to the senior squad, and he left the club by mutual consent on 6 May 2007. After the 2006–07 season, and inside the Premier League era, Newcastle United were now the fifth most successful Premiership club in terms of points gained.

Sam Allardyce was appointed Roeder's replacement as manager on 15 May 2007.

2007–2021: Mike Ashley era
On 7 June, Freddy Shepherd's final shares in the club were sold to Mike Ashley and Shepherd was replaced as chairman by Chris Mort on 25 July. Ashley then announced he would be delisting the club from the London Stock Exchange upon completion of the takeover. The club officially ceased trading on the Stock Exchange as of 8am on 18 July 2007 at 5p a share.

Allardyce departed the club on in January 2008 by mutual consent after a bad start to the 2007–08 season, and Kevin Keegan was reappointed as Newcastle manager. Mort stepped down as chairman in June and was replaced by Derek Llambias, a long-term associate of Ashley. Newcastle finished the 2007–08 season in 12th place, but as the season drew to a close, Keegan publicly criticised the board, stating they were not providing the team enough financial support.

In September 2008, Keegan resigned as manager, stating: "It's my opinion that a manager must have the right to manage and that clubs should not impose upon any manager any player that he does not want". Former Wimbledon manager Joe Kinnear was appointed as his replacement, but in February 2009, due to his heart surgery, Alan Shearer was appointed interim manager in his absence. Under Shearer, the club were relegated to the Championship at the end of the 2008–09 season, the first time the club had left the Premier League since joining it in 1993.

Following their relegation, the club was put up for sale in June 2009, with an asking price of £100 million. Chris Hughton was given the manager job on a caretaker basis before taking over full-time on 27 October 2009. On the same day, Ashley announced that the club was no longer for sale.

Hughton led Newcastle to win the 2009–10 Championship, securing automatic promotion on 5 April 2010 with five games remaining, and securing the title on 19 April; Newcastle were promoted back to the Premier League after just one season away.

Under Hughton, Newcastle enjoyed a strong start to the 2010–11 season, but he was sacked on 6 December 2010. The club's board stated that they felt "an individual with more managerial experience [was] needed to take the club forward." Three days later, Alan Pardew was appointed as manager with a five-and-a-half-year contract. Despite some turbulence, Newcastle were able to finish 12th at the end of the season, with one particular highlight being a 4–4 home draw against Arsenal that saw Newcastle come back from four goals down to claim a point.

The start of the 2011–12 season was very successful as they went on to enjoy one of their strongest openings to a season, playing 11 consecutive games unbeaten. Newcastle eventually secured a place in the 2012–13 Europa League with a fifth-place finish, their highest league position since the Bobby Robson days. Further honours were to come as Pardew won both the Premier League Manager of the Season and the LMA Manager of the Year awards.

In the following season Newcastle made few acquisitions in the summer and suffered injuries over the season. As a result, the first half of the season was marred by a run of 10 losses in 13 games, which saw the club sink near the relegation zone. The Europa League campaign was largely successful with the team making the quarter-finals before bowing out to eventual finalists Benfica. Domestically, Newcastle struggled, and stayed up after a 2–1 victory over already-relegated Queens Park Rangers on the penultimate game of the season.

The 2014–15 season saw Newcastle fail to win any of their first seven games, prompting fans to start a campaign to get Pardew sacked as manager before an upturn in form saw them climb to fifth in the table. Pardew left for Crystal Palace in December. On 26 January 2015, his assistant John Carver was put in charge for the remainder of the season but came close to relegation, staying up on the final day with a 2–0 home win against West Ham, with Jonás Gutiérrez, who beat testicular cancer earlier in the season, scoring the team's second goal.

On 9 June 2015, Carver was sacked and replaced by Steve McClaren the following day. On 11 March 2016, McClaren was sacked after nine months as manager, with Newcastle in 19th place in the Premier League and the club having won just six of 28 Premier League games during his time at the club. He was replaced by Spaniard Rafael Benítez on the same day, who signed a three-year deal, but was not able to prevent the club from being relegated for the second time under Ashley's ownership.

Newcastle returned to the Premier League at the first attempt, winning the Championship title in May 2017. In October, Mike Ashley put Newcastle United up for sale for a second time. The team finished the season with a 3–0 win over the previous year's champions Chelsea, finishing tenth in the league, their highest finish in four years. The following season saw a 13th-place finish, despite being in the relegation zone in January. Ashley came under increased scrutiny for his lack of investment in the squad and apparent focus on other business ventures. Benitez left his position on 30 June 2019 after rejecting a new contract.

On 17 July 2019, former Sunderland manager Steve Bruce was appointed as manager on a three-year contract. Bruce oversaw 13th and 12th-placed finishes during his first two seasons in charge, both of which being affected by the COVID-19 pandemic.

2021–present: PIF era
On 7 October 2021, after 14 years as owner, Ashley sold the club to a new consortium for a reported £305 million. The consortium was made up of Saudi Arabia's Public Investment Fund, RB Sports & Media and PCP Capital Partners. On 20 October 2021, Bruce left his position by mutual consent, after receiving a reported £8 million payout. Eddie Howe was appointed as Bruce's replacement a few weeks later on 8 November 2021. Howe guided the club to an 11th-place finish after a run of 12 wins in their final 18 games, and Newcastle became the first team in Premier League history to avoid relegation after failing to win any of their first 14 games.

On 30 May 2022, the club announced they had reached an agreement of a compensation fee with Brighton & Hove Albion to appoint Dan Ashworth as the new Sporting Director; the appointment was confirmed on 6 June 2022. On 15 July 2022, the club brought in Darren Eales, from Major League Soccer team Atlanta United FC, as the club's new chief executive officer – acting as a "key member of the club's leadership structure".

On 21 August 2022, Newcastle United Women moved to the club's ownership for the first time, after a formal restructuring.

Club identity

The club's home colours are a black and white striped shirt. Shorts and socks are usually black with white trim, though white socks are sometimes worn under some managers who consider them "lucky". Newcastle's colours at the outset was generally the home kit of Newcastle East End, comprising plain red shirts with white shorts and red socks. In 1894, the club adopted the black and white striped shirts, which had been used as the reserve team's colours. These colours were chosen for the senior team because they were not associated with either of the two teams United were merged from. They played in grey shorts until 1897, and between 1897 and 1921, they played in blue shorts before adopting the black shorts they play in now.

United's away colours have changed a number of times over the years. They played in white shirts and black shorts from 1914 until 1961, and then white shorts until 1966. They then played in yellow shirts and blue shorts for the 1967–68 season, but from 1969 to 1974 played in all red with an all blue third kit. In 1974, they returned to a yellow shirt, which they played with various coloured shorts until 1983. They played in all grey from 1983 to 1988, before once again returning to the yellow kit until 1993. Since 1995, the away kit has changed frequently and has not been the same for more than a single season.
Through former owner Mike Ashley, the club also had a relationship with the Sports Direct retail chain which he founded.

On 4 January 2012, Virgin Money, which had just bought Northern Rock, signed a two-year deal to sponsor Newcastle United. In January 2010, Puma became the official supplier and licensee of replica merchandise for Newcastle. The deal meant Puma supplied the team kit, replica kit and training equipment for the 2010–11 and 2011–12 seasons.

The current club crest was first used in the 1988–89 season. The crest includes elements from the coat of arms of the city of Newcastle upon Tynethe two sea horses representing Tyneside's strong connections with the sea, the castle representing the city's keep. The city's coat of arms were first embroidered on the team's shirts in 1969 and worn as standard until 1976. A scroll at the bottom featured the city's motto in Latin; fortiter defendit triumphans which translates into English as "triumphing by brave defence." From 1976 until 1983, the club wore a specific badge which was developed to wear in place of the city's coat of arms. The design was of a circular shape, which featured the club's name in full, it contained a magpie standing in front of the River Tyne with the historic keep of Newcastle in the background. A more simplistic design followed in 1983, featuring the initials of the club's name, NUFC with the small magpie used in the previous crest within the horizontally laid "C," this logo was relatively short lived and was discontinued after 1988.

In May 2013, Newcastle released the away shirt for the 2013–14 season which for the first time featured the Wonga.com logo, which attracted criticism from many Newcastle supporters; the shirt was navy blue with light blue bands. The shirt received mixed reviews from Newcastle supporters, who described the shirt as both "awesome" and "bland", as quoted in the Newcastle daily Evening Chronicle. In July 2013, Newcastle striker and practising Muslim Papiss Cissé refused to wear any official kit or training wear with reference to Wonga.com, subsequently failing to travel to the team's 2013 pre-season tour of Portugal. The matter was later resolved. Wonga collapsed in administration in 2018.

On 15 May 2017, the home shirt for the 2017–18 season was revealed, featuring the logo of new sponsors Fun88. The shirt was shown to include a gold and silver commemorative crest to mark the club's 125th football season, based on the city's coat of arms. It was also announced that the kit would feature red numbers for the first time since the 1992–93 season. Previous kit sponsors include Newcastle Breweries (1980–1986), Greenall's Beers (1986–1990), McEwan's Lager and Newcastle Brown Ale (1990–2000), NTL (2000–2003), Northern Rock (2003–2012), Virgin Money (2012–2013) and Wonga.com (2013–2017).

Newcastle United's current kit manufacturers are Castore, in a deal that started in 2021. Previous kit manufacturers include Bukta (1974–1975, 1976–1980), Umbro (1975–1976, 1980–1993), Asics (1993–1995), Adidas (1995–2010) and Puma (2010–2021). Other current team sponsors include Fun888, Parimatch, Carling, Monster Energy, eToro, BoyleSports, Dr. Cinik Hair Hospital, TOMKET, Pulman, Cybit and Energy Impact Limited.

Newcastle United's current sleeve sponsor is noon.com, in a deal that started in 2022. Previous sleeve sponsors include MRF Tyres (2017–2018), StormGain (2019–2020), ICM.com (2020–2021) and Kayak (2021–2022).

Stadium

Throughout Newcastle United's history, their home venue has been St James' Park, the oldest and largest football stadium in North East England, as well as the sixth-largest football stadium in the United Kingdom. It has hosted 10 international football matches at senior level, the first in 1901 and the most recent in 2005. It was used as a venue for both the 2012 Summer Olympics and the 2015 Rugby World Cup.

Football had been played at St James' Park as early as 1880, the ground being occupied by Newcastle Rangers, before becoming the home of Newcastle West End in 1886. Its lease was then bought by Newcastle East End in 1892, before they changed their name to Newcastle United. At the turn of the 20th century, the ground's capacity was given as 30,000 before being redeveloped between 1900 and 1905, increasing the capacity to 60,000 and making it the biggest stadium in England for a time. For most of the 20th century, the stadium changed very little, despite various plans for development of the ground. The old West Stand was replaced with the Milburn Stand in 1987, the Sir John Hall Stand replacing the Leazes End in 1993, and the rest of the ground renovated making the ground a 37,000 capacity all-seater stadium. Between 1998 and 2000, double tiers were added to the Milburn and Sir John Hall stands to bring the venue up to its current capacity of 52,354. There were plans to build a new 90,000 seater stadium in Leazes park, just behind St James' with Newcastle Falcons taking over St James' Park, but due to protests the plans were dropped. St James' Park currently seats 52,354 people, but former club owner Mike Ashley had said he would consider taking the roof off The Gallowgate end and adding another 6,000 seats, taking the total capacity to 58,420, but only if the team managed to finish in the top six places of the Premier League.

In October 2009, Ashley announced that he planned to lease the name of the ground in a bid to increase revenue, and in November the stadium was temporarily renamed sportsdirect.com @ St James' Park Stadium. This name was only supposed to be used until the end of the 2009–10 season, but lasted until November 2011. On 10 November 2011, the club officially changed the name of the stadium to the Sports Direct Arena, although this was an interim name to showcase the sponsorship capabilities of the stadium. The company, owned by Ashley, was not paying anything for the deal. In October 2012, payday loan company Wonga.com became Newcastle United's main commercial sponsor and purchased the stadium naming rights but restored the St James' Park name.

Since 1982, the stadium is served by St James Metro station on the Tyne and Wear Metro. The station is decorated in a black and white colour scheme, with archive photographs of the club's players.

The club's current training ground is located at Darsley Park, which is north of the city at Benton. The facility was opened in July 2003 and is also used by the Newcastle Falcons rugby team.

Ownership
Newcastle United was set up as a private company limited by shares on 6 September 1895. The club traded in this way for much of the 20th century, dominated by McKeag, Westwood and Seymour family ownership, until April 1997, when John Hall, who bought 72.9% of the club for £3 million in 1991, floated the club on the stock exchange as a public limited company, with less than half the shares sold to the Hall family and the majority holding going to his business partner Freddy Shepherd. Later that year, Hall stepped down as chairman and was replaced by Shepherd, with the Hall family represented on the board by John's son Douglas. In December 1998, after buying a 6.3% stake in the club for £10 million, the media group NTL had considered a full takeover of the club. This was later dropped after the Competition Commission, established in April 1999, expressed concerns about football clubs being owned by media companies.

In 2007, businessman Mike Ashley purchased the combined stakes of both Douglas and John Hall, 41% share in the club, through a holding company St James Holdings, with a view to buy the rest. Upon purchasing this share, he appointed Chris Mort as chairman, while gaining more shares, owning 93.19% of the club by 29 June 2007. This figure reached 95% on 11 July 2007, forcing the remaining shareholders to sell their shares.

After completing the purchase of the club, Ashley had announced that he planned to sell the club on three occasions. The first occurred after fan protests over the resignation of Kevin Keegan in September 2008, when Ashley stated, "I have listened to you. You want me out. That is what I am now trying to do." However, he took it off the market on 28 December 2008 after being unable to find a buyer. On 31 May 2009, it was reported that Ashley was attempting to sell the club again. On 8 June 2009, Ashley confirmed that the club was up for sale at an asking price of £100 million. By the end of August 2009, the club was back off the market. On 16 October 2017, Newcastle United announced that Ashley had once again put the club up for sale, reporting that he hoped that a deal could be concluded by Christmas 2017.

Saudi-led takeover

In April 2020, it was widely reported that a consortium consisting of Public Investment Fund, PCP Capital Partners and RB Sports & Media, was finalising an offer to acquire Newcastle United. The proposed sale prompted concerns and criticism, such as arguments considering it sportwashing of Saudi Arabia's human rights record, as well as ongoing piracy of sports broadcasts in the region.

In May 2020, two Conservative MPs called upon the government to scrutinise aspects of the deal, with Karl McCartney calling for the sale to be blocked, and Giles Watling calling upon the Department for Digital, Culture, Media and Sport (DCMS) to hold an oral evidence session regarding sports piracy in Saudi Arabia. In May 2020, The Guardian reported that the Premier League had obtained a report from the World Trade Organization (published publicly the following month), which contained evidence that Saudi nationals had backed beoutQ – a pirate broadcaster carrying the beIN Sports networks in the region since the Qatar diplomatic crisis. In June 2020, The Guardian reported that Richard Masters, who appeared in front of the DCMS, had hinted possible takeover of Newcastle United. The MPs warned it would be humiliating to allow a Saudi Arabian consortium to take charge given the country's record on piracy and human rights.

In July 2020, The Guardian reported that Saudi Arabia's decision to ban beIN Sports broadcast from operating in the nation, had further complicated the takeover of Newcastle United. On 30 July 2020, Saudi Arabia announced its withdrawal from the Newcastle deal, stating "with a deep appreciation for the Newcastle community and the significance of its football club, we have come to the decision to withdraw our interest in acquiring Newcastle United Football Club". The group also stated that the "prolonged process" was a major factor in them pulling out. The collapse of the takeover was met with widespread criticism from Newcastle fans, with Newcastle MP Chi Onwurah accusing the Premier League of treating fans of the club with "contempt" and subsequently wrote to Masters for an explanation.

Despite the consortium's withdrawal, disputes over the takeover continued. On 9 September 2020, Newcastle United released a statement claiming that the Premier League had officially rejected the takeover by the consortium and accused Masters and the Premier League board of "[not] acting appropriately in relation to [the takeover]", while stating that the club would be considering any relevant legal action. The Premier League strongly denied this in a statement released the next day, expressing "surprise" and "disappointment" at Newcastle's statement.

On 7 October 2021, the Public Investment Fund, PCP Capital Partners and RB Sports & Media confirmed that they had officially completed the acquisition of Newcastle United. An investigation in May 2022 by The Guardian claimed that the British government of Boris Johnson was involved in Saudi Arabia's takeover of Newcastle United. In April 2021, it was revealed that Saudi Crown Prince Mohammed bin Salman had warned Johnson in a text message, stating that the Premier League's decision would impact on UK-Saudi diplomatic relations. Following the warning, Johnson had appointed his special envoy for the Gulf, Edward Lister, to take up the case. It was later reported that Johnson's extensive efforts also involved the Minister of Investment Gerry Grimstone, who held discussions with the Premier League chairman Gary Hoffman and Saudi representatives well-connected with MBS' office. The UK government and Johnson said they were not involved in the Saudi takeover. After Premier League's approval, Hoffman informed the 20 English Football clubs that there was extensive pressure from the government; he said the decision was not influenced by it. A separate report revealed that despite the US' conclusion that Jamal Khashoggi's assassination was ordered by Saudi's Prince Mohammed, he was able to avert the owners' and directors' test of the Premier League. Human Rights Watch (HRW), a campaign group, has accused the Saudi government of using football, motor racing, and golf for sportswashing. As reported by Josh Noble, a sports editor for the Financial Times, HRW defines sportswashing as "an effort to distract from its serious human rights abuses by taking over events that celebrate human achievement".

Social responsibility
Newcastle United established the Newcastle United Foundation in summer 2008, which seeks to encourage learning and promote healthy living amongst disadvantaged children, young people and families in the North East region, as well as promoting equality and diversity. The Foundation's manager Kate Bradley told charity news website The Third Sector, "Children look up to players as their heroes, and anything they say is instantly taken on board. If Newcastle defender Steven Taylor tells them not to eat a Mars bar for breakfast, they'll listen." In 2010, the charity taught over 5,000 children about healthy living.

The Foundation's commitment, along with a similar foundation run by West Bromwich Albion, the unique relationship that Aston Villa has with Acorns Children's Hospice and Tottenham Hotspur has with SOS Children's Villages UK, are some leading examples of commitment in the highest level of football to responsibility and change in the communities in which they work and who enrich them through their support and ticket sales. The work of these clubs, and others, is changing the way professional sport interacts with their communities and supporters.

In December 2012, the club announced that it had become the world's first carbon positive football club.

Supporters and rivalries

The Newcastle United Independent Supporters Association is the official supporter's group for the club. Through its chairman Frank Gilmore, a local pub manager, the group has been quoted in the press with regard to events at Newcastle United since 2002. Supporters of Newcastle United are drawn from all over the North East and beyond, with supporters' clubs in some countries across the world. The club's nickname is The Magpies, while the club's supporters are also known as the Geordies or the Toon Army. The name Toon originates from the Geordie pronunciation of town. In a 2004 survey by Co-operative Financial Services, it was found that Newcastle United topped the league table for the cost incurred and distance travelled by Newcastle-based fans wishing to travel to every Premier League away game. The total distance travelled for a fan to attend every away game from Newcastle was found to be equivalent to a round-the-world trip. In the 2009–10 season, when the club were playing in English football's second tier, the Championship, the average attendance at St James' Park was 43,388, the fourth-highest for an English club that season. At the end of the 2011–12 Premier league season, Newcastle United held the third-highest average attendance for the season, at 49,935. This figure was only surpassed by Arsenal and Manchester United, the only two clubs in the Premier League with larger stadiums at the time.

The club's supporters publish a number of fanzines including True Faith and The Mag, along with NUFC.com, which was established in 1996. They set up Newcastle United Supporters Trust in September 2008, aiming to "represent the broad church of Newcastle United's support." In addition to the usual English football chants, Newcastle's supporters sing the traditional Tyneside song "Blaydon Races." Prior to each home game the team enters the field to "Local Hero", written by Newcastle supporter Mark Knopfler, founder of Dire Straits. Traditionally, Newcastle's main rivals are Sunderland, against whom the Tyne–Wear derby is competed, along with Middlesbrough, with whom they compete in the Tyne-Tees derby.

In 1998, The Police founder and Newcastle fan Sting wrote a song in support of Newcastle, called "Black and White Army (Bringing The Pride Back Home)". In 2015, some Newcastle fans boycotted games in protest of club management by Mike Ashley, and they were supported by famous club fans like Sting and Jimmy Nail.

Records and statistics

As of the 2019–20 season, Newcastle United have spent 88 seasons in the top-flight. They are eighth in the all-time Premier League table and have the ninth-highest total of major honours won by an English club with 11 wins. The holder of the record for the most appearances is Jimmy Lawrence, having made 496 first team appearances between 1904 and 1921. The club's top goalscorer is Alan Shearer, who scored 206 goals in all competitions between 1996 and 2006. Andy Cole holds the record for the most goals scored in a season: 41 in the 1993–94 season in the Premier League. Shay Given is the most capped international for the club, with 134 appearances for Republic of Ireland.

The club's widest victory margin in the league was in the 13–0 win against Newport County in the Second Division in 1946. Their heaviest defeat in the league was 9–0 against Burton Wanderers in the Second Division in 1895. The club's longest number of consecutive seasons in the top flight of English football was 32 from 1898 to 1899 until 1933–34.

Newcastle's record home attendance is 68,386 for a First Division match against Chelsea on 3 September 1930. The club's highest attendance in the Premier League is 52,389, in a match against Manchester City on 6 May 2012. Newcastle lost the game 2–0. The highest transfer fee received for a Newcastle player is £35 million, from Liverpool for Andy Carroll in January 2011, while the most spent by the club on a player is £63 million, for Alexander Isak from La Liga side Real Sociedad in August 2022.

Players

Current squad

Out on loan

Reserves and Academy

Notable players

Player of the Year
Source: Newcastle United F.C.

Club officials

Current backroom staff

First team

Under-21 and under-18 teams

Scouting team

Board of directors

Honours
Source:

Domestic

League
First Division / Premier League (level 1)
Winners: 1904–05, 1906–07, 1908–09, 1926–27
Runners-up: 1995–96, 1996–97

Second Division / Championship (level 2)
Winners: 1964–65, 1992–93, 2009–10, 2016–17
Runners-up: 1897–98, 1947–48

Cups
FA Cup
Winners: 1909–10, 1923–24, 1931–32, 1950–51, 1951–52, 1954–55
Runners-up: 1904–05, 1905–06, 1907–08, 1910–11, 1973–74, 1997–98, 1998–99

Football League Cup / EFL Cup
Runners-up: 1975–76, 2022–23

FA Charity Shield
Winners: 1909
Runners-up: 1932, 1951, 1952, 1955, 1996

Sheriff of London Charity Shield
Winners: 1907

Texaco Cup
Winners: 1973–74, 1974–75

European

Inter-Cities Fairs Cup
Winners: 1968–69

UEFA Intertoto Cup
Winners: 2006

Anglo-Italian Cup
Winners: 1973

See also
Newcastle United W.F.C.

References

External links

 
Sport in Newcastle upon Tyne
Football clubs in England
Companies formerly listed on the London Stock Exchange
Association football clubs established in 1892
Former English Football League clubs
FA Cup winners
Premier League clubs
Football clubs in Tyne and Wear
1892 establishments in England
Public Investment Fund
Reuben Brothers
Inter-Cities Fairs Cup winning clubs
UEFA Intertoto Cup winning clubs